Ken Rattenbury (10 September 1920 – 9 April 2001) was an English jazz trumpeter, pianist and composer and author born in Spilsby, Lincolnshire to Sidney, a postmaster.      and Maude (nee Miller), a homemaker. He would go on to serve in the British Army from 1940 to 1946 as a private first class. He received a World War II Victory Medal, Defence Medal, and the British Expeditionary Forces medal.

Jazz career
He first joined a jazz band playing the piano in 1933. While in the Service, he took up the trumpet and toured the European Theatre of World War II leading his own band. In 1946 he had a stint with Stars in Battledress, and after being demobilized lived in the English Midlands. He mostly did freelancing until he formed his own band in 1951. He wrote an extended jazz suite in honor of Bix Beiderbecke, called Mirror to Bix, and had George Chisholm and Steve Racein him group. During 1963 and 1964, he composed and broadcast two thirty-minute jazz suites, The Seven Ages of Man and The Rime of the Ancient Mariner, and again had some of the greats of jazz play with him, Kenny Baker and had Michael Hordern reciting the famous Shakespearean soliloquy, "All the world's a stage ..." in the Seven Ages suite. He then worked for EMI to produce full-length albums of incidental music to stories by Hans Christian Andersen and The Brothers Grimm. He then established the Jazz Four.

He got his M.A. from University of Keele in 1984. Rattenbury is most notable for his Duke Ellington biography, but also had been commissioned by the BBC in the 1960s to compose two half-hour jazz suites titled The Seven Ages of Man and The Rime Of The Ancient Mariner.

Personal life
He married Elsie May Cross on 8 May 1941. He appeared on BBC Light Program on Friday nights. With Ted Heath in the early 1960s he wrote and performed 30 minute jazz soliloquies.

Works
 Duke Ellington, Jazz Composer Yale University Press, 1990; 
 Jazz Journey 1925-94, 1995; autobiography

Notes

Bibliography

External links
Obituary in The Independent
Obituary in The Last Post

1920 births
2001 deaths
Alumni of Keele University
English jazz pianists
English jazz trumpeters
Male trumpeters
English writers
People from Spilsby
20th-century pianists
20th-century English musicians
20th-century trumpeters
British male pianists
20th-century British male musicians
20th-century British musicians
British male jazz musicians
British Army personnel of World War II
British Army soldiers